Herbert Hunt may refer to:
 Herbert Hunt (translator) (1899–1973), English academic, author and translator
 Herbert Hunt (cricketer), New Zealand cricketer
 Herbert Hunt (footballer) (1880–1936), English footballer
 Herbert R. Hunt  (1885–1961), American architect